Plagiomus multinotatus is a species of beetle in the family Cerambycidae, and the only species in the genus Plagiomus. It was described by Quedenfeldt in 1888.

References

Tragocephalini
Beetles described in 1888